The Ministry of Science and Technology (MOST), is the regional executive department of the Bangsamoro Autonomous Region in Muslim Mindanao (BARMM) responsible for affairs relating to science and technology in the region.

History
The Ministry of Science and Technology (MOST) considers itself as a succeeding agency of the regional office of the Philippine national government's Department of Science and Technology (DOST) which oversaw science and technology affairs in the Autonomous Region in Muslim Mindanao (ARMM), Bangsamoro's predecessor regional government.

When the ARMM was succeeded by the Bangsamoro Autonomous Region in Muslim Mindanao (BARMM) in 2019, the regional departments of the former ARMM were reconfigured into ministries of Bangsamoro. When the MOST was established it absorbed the existing programs and projects of the DOST for now defunct ARMM.

Ministers

References

Science and Technology
Bangsamoro
Science and technology in the Philippines